Abacus.AI is an Artificial Intelligence and Machine Learning platform headquartered in the San Francisco Bay Area.

Description
Initially known as RealityEngines.AI, the company was founded by Bindu Reddy, Arvind Sundararajan, and Siddartha Naidu in 2019. Abacus.AI markets using the terms artificial intelligence and machine learning. The company raised $5.3 million in seed funding round led by Eric Schmidt in 2019. In 2020, it raised $13 million led by Index Ventures (changing its name to Abacus.AI in January), and $22 million led by Coatue. In 2021, it raised $50 million led by Tiger Global Management.

Technology 
Abacus.AI can be used to set up data pipelines, specify custom machine learning specific transformations, train models and deploy and monitor them, and build deep learning systems. In addition to the core platform, Abacus.AI provides use-case specific workflows including personalization, forecasting, and anomaly detection. The company has invented several neural architecture search methods that can create custom neural networks from data sets based on a specific use-case.

Abacus.AI is able to connect to various data sources including S3, Google Cloud and Azure which makes it easy to set up data transformations for machine learning. Once the data is transformed, Abacus.AI utilizes neural architecture search (NAS) techniques to create a custom neural network based on the dataset provided and the use-case. The data is given to the platform then evaluated to determine which “tool” (NAS) is best suited for that use-case. Different use-cases such as demand forecasting, churn reduction, and name entity recognition will use different NAS techniques to provide the best model. For example, for incident detection, Abacus.AI uses a technique called variational encoders.

Abacus.AI uses an autonomous AI generation service, announced in January 2020. While this might lead to neural networks not being trained with data that is relevant to a customer, Abacus.AI says it creates synthetic data that augments the original dataset, and then trains a deep learning model on the combined dataset.

This AI service uses generative adversarial network (GAN), a technique that generates new similar data given a training set. They further improved this technique using data augmentation (DAGAN), creating synthetic data sets when not enough data is available for training. 

This service was originally confined to the automatic models. However, in August 2021, this service was expanded to any TensorFlow or PyTorch model. This allowed the platform to take in data in a streaming fashion providing companies the ability stream real-time events like clickstream data (a user’s online activity), online purchases, social media interactions, media views from websites and “internet of things” sensors. This data can then be used to train the models similar to the processes mentioned.

Research 
Abacus.AI published research papers at the Conference on Neural Information Processing Systems. Synthetic Benchmarks for Scientific Research in Explainable Machine Learning releases XAI-Bench, a suite of synthetic data sets that can be configured and re-engineered to simulate real-world date. NAS-Bench-x11 and the Power of Learning Curves explores singular value decomposition and noise modeling to create surrogate benchmarks and delves into the learning curve extrapolation framework. How Powerful are Performance Predictors in Neural Architecture Search is the first large-scale study of performance predictors with an analysis of 31 techniques. A Study on Encodings for Neural Architecture Search proposed a way to encode a neural network architecture to be efficiently manipulated by a search algorithm. Intra-Processing Methods for Debiasing Neural Networks laid the foundations for the platform’s debiasing services.

Other published papers include An Analysis of Super-Neut Heuristics in Weight-Sharing NAS on TPAMI, Learning by Turning: Neural Architecture Aware Optimization on ICML, BANANAS: Bayesian Optimization with Neural Architectures for Neural Architecture Search on AAAI, and Exploring the Loss of Landscape in Neural Architecture Search on UAI.

These research findings served as the groundwork for the techniques utilized by Abacus.AI. Additionally, they have used these techniques in the Conference on Computer Vision and Pattern Recognition (CVPR).

References 

AI companies
Companies established in 2019